This is the discography of English singer Alfie Boe.

Albums

Studio albums

Compilation albums

Video albums

Album appearances

Singles

References

Boe, Alfie